

Singles produced

2001

Fat Joe – Jealous Ones Still Envy (J.O.S.E.)
03. "King of N.Y."

2002

Fat Joe – Loyalty
03. "Prove Something"
04. "TS Piece"
07. "Born in the Ghetto"
08. "Crush Tonight"
10. "All I Need"
11. "Life Goes On"
12. "Loyalty"

Ja Rule – Last Temptation
13. "Destiny (Outro)"

Various artists – All About the Benjamins
01. Trina – "Told Y'All"

Angie Martinez – Animal House
06. "Take You Home"
08. "We Can Get It On"
09. "What's That Sound"
11. "Waitin' On"

2003

Killer Mike – Monster
06. "All 4 U"
10. "Home Of The Brave"

Various artists – 2 Fast 2 Furious
11. Fat Joe – "We Ridin'"
13. Dirtbag – "Fuck What a Nigga Say..."

Various artists – Bad Boys II
05. Fat Joe & Diddy – "Girl I'm A Bad Boy"

2004

8Ball & MJG – Living Legends
18. "Confessions"

Terror Squad – True Story
03. "Hum Drum"
05. "Take Me Home" (featuring Dre) (co–produced by Streetrunner)
10. "Let Them Things Go" (featuring Dre & Young Selah)

Jacki–O – Poe Little Rich Girl
02. "Ms. Jacki"

Trick Daddy – Thug Matrimony: Married to the Streets
15. "Thugs About"

Ja Rule - R.U.L.E.
05. "New York" (featuring Fat Joe and Jadakiss)

2005

Chamillionaire – The Sound of Revenge
05. "No Snitchin'" (featuring Bun B)

Chris Brown – Chris Brown
09. "What's My Name"

C-Ride
00.We Came
00.Fresh
00.Chicken & Beef feat. Dre
00.Its An Epidemic
00.Im that Fly
00.Get In Line
00.Super Star
00.Im All Dat

Fat Joe – All or Nothing
04. "So Much More"
05. "My Fofo"
06. "Rock Ya Body"
12. "I Can Do U"
13. "So Hot" (featuring R. Kelly)

Lil Wayne – Tha Carter II
21. "Get Over" (featuring Nikki)

Slim Thug – Already Platinum
13. "Miss Mary"

Teairra Mari – Roc-A-Fella Presents: Teairra Mari
08. "Get Down Tonight"

Diamond
00. "Hear Me Coming" (featuring T.I.)

Trina – Glamorest Life
01. "Sum Mo" (featuring Dre)
13. "Lil' Mama" (featuring Dre)

The Game – The Documentary
04. "Hate It Or Love It" (featuring 50 Cent)

2006

Juvenile - Reality Check
05. "Rodeo"

Christina Milian – So Amazin'
01. "Say I" (featuring Young Jeezy)
02. "Twisted"
03. "Gonna Tell Everybody"
04. "Who's Gonna Ride" (featuring Three 6 Mafia)
05. "So Amazing" (featuring Dre)
06. "Hot Boy" (featuring Dre)
07. "Foolin'"
08. "My Lovin' Goes"
09. "Just a Little Bit"
12. "Tonight (International Bonus)"
13. "She Don't Know "

DJ Khaled – Listennn... The Album
06. "Holla at Me" (featuring Lil Wayne, Paul Wall, Fat Joe, Rick Ross and Pitbull)
08. "Destroy You" (featuring Krayzie Bone & Twista)
10. "Candy Paint" (featuring Slim Thug, Trina & Chamillionaire)
15. "Movement" (featuring Dre)

E-40 - My Ghetto Report Card
10. "Block Boi" (featuring Miko & Stressmatic) (produced with Studio ToN)

Ghostface Killah – Fishscale
24. "Three Bricks" (featuring Raekwon& Notorious B.I.G.)

Juvenile – The Reality Check
05. "Rodeo" 
09. "Break a Brick Down" (featuring Dre)

3LW – Point of No Return
00. "The Club Is Over"

Kelis – Kelis Was Here
07. "Goodbyes"

Nashawn – Napalm
15. "Money Machine" (featuring Nas, Ying Yang Twins & Jungle)

Remy Ma – There's Something about Remy: Based on a True Story
04. "Tight" (featuring Fat Joe)
18. "Still" (featuring Dre)

Rhymefest – Blue Collar
08. "More" (featuring Kanye West)
10. "All Girls Cheat" (featuring Mario)

Rick Ross – Port of Miami
03. "Blow" (featuring Dre)
07. "Boss" (featuring Dre)

Young Jeezy – The Inspiration
09. "Streets on Lock"

2007

Beanie Sigel – The Solution
02. "Bout That (Let Me Know)"

Chingy – Hate It or Love It
13. "Roll on 'Em" (featuring Rick Ross)

DJ Khaled – We the Best
04. "Brown Paper Bag" (featuring Dre, Young Jeezy, Juelz Santana, Rick Ross, Lil Wayne & Fat Joe)
07. "I'm From the Ghetto" (featuring Dre, The Game, Jadakiss & Trick Daddy)
11. "The Originators" (featuring Bone Thugs-N-Harmony)
12. "New York Is Back" (featuring Jadakiss, Fat Joe & Ja Rule)
15. "Choppers" (featuring Dre, Joe Hound & C-Ride)

Freeway – Free at Last
13. "Lights Get Low" (featuring Rick Ross & Dre)

Jody Breeze
00. "Let's Ride"

Joe – Ain't Nothin' Like Me
09. "Let's Just Do It" (featuring Fabolous)
11. "Just Relax" (featuring Dre)

Tru-Life – Tru York
03. "If You Want To"
14. "Scarface"

Yung Joc – Hustlenomics
02. "Play Your Cards"

Birdman - 5 * Stunna
06. "100 Million" (featuring Young Jeezy, Rick Ross, and Lil Wayne)

2008

Fat Joe - The Elephant in the Room
02. "Ain't Sayin' Nothin'" (featuring Dre & Plies)

Ace Hood – Gutta
14. "Ghetto" (featuring Dre)

B.G. – Too Hood 2 Be Hollywood
10. "Ya Heard Me" (featuring Juvenile, Lil Wayne and Trey Songz)
00. "Look Girl" (featuring Ray J)

Busta Rhymes – We Made It (CDS)
01. "We Made It (Album Version)"

David Banner – The Greatest Story Ever Told
08. "A Girl"
16. "Fuck You Hoes" (featuring Jim Jones)

DJ Khaled – We Global
05. "I'm On" (featuring Nas & Cool)

DJ Pharris – Hood Radio
00. "Stop" (featuring DJ Khaled, The Game, Rick Ross & Sly Polaroid)

The Game – LAX
05. "My Life" (featuring Lil Wayne)
06. "Money"
01. "Big Dreams" (Deluxe Edition Bonus CD)
02. "Camera Phone" (featuring Ne–Yo) (Deluxe Edition Bonus CD)
00. "Red Magic" (featuring Lil Wayne) (Unused Track)

Gym Class Heroes – The Quilt
09. "Don't Tell Me It's Over" (featuring Dre & Lil Wayne)
10. "Live Forever (Fly with Me)" (featuring Daryl Hall)
12. "Home" (featuring Dre)

Jay Rock – Follow Me Home
 01. "All My Life" (featuring Lil Wayne & will.i.am)

Lil Wayne – Tha Carter III
07. "Phone Home"

Ludacris – "The Preview"
14. "Throw It Up" (Busta Rhymes featuring Lil Wayne & Ludacris)

Omar Cruz – Sign of the Cruz
 "Gangsta Music" (featuring The Game)

Q-Tip – Smirnoff Signature Mix Series (VLS)
A3. "Midnight '08 (Radio Edit)"

Scarface – Emeritus
03. "Forget About Me" (featuring Lil Wayne & Bun B)

Nas - Untitled Nas album
04. "Make the World Go Round" (featuring Chris Brown & The Game)

2009

Busta Rhymes – Back on My B.S.
12. "Don't Believe 'Em" (featuring Akon & T.I.)
Leftover
00. "We Made It" (feat. Linkin Park) (Co-produced by Mike Shinoda)

Lil Wayne – No Ceilings
18. "No Ceilings" (featuring Birdman)

Wale – Attention: Deficit
05. "World Tour" (featuring Jazmine Sullivan)
09. "Chillin" (featuring Lady Gaga)

C-Ride - Automatic Vibe

02. "Dat What It Iz" (featuring The Game & Jimmy Dade)
14. "Otha S**t"
17. "Lights Low" (featuring 2 Pistols & Young Joe)
25. "Freak By Nature"

Young Money Entertainment – We Are Young Money
01. "Gooder"

Queen Latifah – Persona
01. "The Light"
02. "Fast Car" (featuring Missy Elliott)
03. "Cue The Rain"
04. "My Couch" (featuring Cool & Dre)
05. "Take Me Away (With You)" (featuring Marsha Ambrosius)
06. "With You"
07. "Hard To Love Ya" (featuring Busta Rhymes, Shawn Stockman, & Dre)
08. "What's The Plan"
09. "Long Ass Week"
10. "Runnin"
11. "People" (featuring Mary J. Blige)
13. "Over The Mountain"
14. "The World"
15. "So What He Gay"

Triple C's – Custom Cars & Cycles
14. "Hustla" (featuring Masspike Miles)

2 Pistols – Arrogant
 "Lights Low Pt. 2" (featuring Young Joe & C-Ride)

2010

Ace Mac
 "I'll Kill" (featuring Dre and Busta Rhymes)
 "Piece Of The Pie" (featuring Dre)

Lil Wayne – Rebirth
04. "Da Da Da"
05. "Paradice"
06. "Get a Life"
07. "On Fire"
13. "I'll Die For You"

Game – The Red Room
 19. "Shake" (TRV$ Remix)

Fat Joe – The Darkside Vol. 1
02. "Valley of Death"
07. "If It Ain't About Money" (featuring Trey Songz)
13. "At Last Supremacy" (featuring Busta Rhymes)

Yo Gotti
 "Teenage Numbers" (featuring Rick Ross)

Lil Wayne – I Am Not a Human Being
 08. "Popular" (featuring Lil Twist)

Game – Brake Lights
 03. "Cold Blood" (featuring Dre and Busta Rhymes)
 04. "MIA (3 Heats: Lebron James, Bosh, Wade)"
 05. "Stop" (featuring Rick Ross)
 06. "Street Riders" (featuring Nas and Akon)
 07. "HaHaHaHaHa"
 09. "That's the Way the Game Goes" (featuring Shawty Lo)
 10. "Ecstasy"
 13. "You Are the Blood"

2011

Game – Purp & Patron
 12. "The Kill"

Game – Hoodmorning (notypo): Candy Coronas
13. "Infrared"
15. "Red" (featuring Redman)

Game – The R.E.D. Album
 02. "The City" (featuring Kendrick Lamar)
 05. "Red Nation" (featuring Lil Wayne)
 07. "Good Girls Gone Bad (featuring Drake)
 00. "Big Money" (Leftover track)
 00. "Shake" (Leftover track)

Lil Wayne – Tha Carter IV
11. "So Special" (featuring John Legend)
14. "It's Good" (featuring Drake and Jadakiss)
16. "I Like the View" (Deluxe Edition Bonus Track)

Tyga
 "Wonder Woman" (featuring Chris Brown)
 "Mr. Night Bros" (featuring Game & Lil Wayne)

2012

Alley Boy – The Gift Of Discernment
 13. "All For You"

Don Trip – Guerrilla
 03. "Allen Iverson"

Don Trip – Help Is On The Way
 01. "Shelter"
 07. "Still Got Love..." (featuring Jeremih)
 08. "Too Little, Too Late"

Game – California Republic
 04. "Hit The J" (featuring Lifestyle)

Tyga – Careless World: Rise of the Last King
 18. "Let It Show" (featuring J. Cole)

Rick Ross – God Forgives, I Don't
 04. "Ashamed"

The Game – Jesus Piece
 04. "Pray" (featuring J. Cole & JMSN)
 06. "All That (Lady)" (featuring Lil Wayne, Big Sean, Jeremih and Fabolous)
 07. "Heaven's Arms"
 10. "Can't Get Right" (featuring K. Roosevelt)

2013

Lil Wayne – I Am Not a Human Being II
17. "Hot Revolver"

Fat Joe – The Darkside III
 02. "Madison Squares" 
 09. "Bass"

The Game – OKE: Operation Kill Everything
 05. "F.I.V.E." 
 07. "Breakfast With Al Pacino"

Yo Gotti – I Am
01. "I Am"

2014

French Montana – Coke Boys 4
06. "All For You"

Ace Hood – Starvation III
09. "Home Invasion"

Vado – Sinatra
02. "Week Ago"

2015

Currensy – Pilot Talk III
01. "Opening Credits"
07. "The 560 SL" 
09. "Life I Choose" 
10. "Pot Jar" 
12. "All I Know"

French Montana – Casino Life 2: Brown Bag Legend
13. "In The Sun"

Fat Trel – Georgetown
04. "Brrrr"

Lil Wayne – Free Weezy Album
15. "Pick Up Your Heart"

The Game – The Documentary 2
1-06. "Dollar and a Dream" 
2-06. "From Adam"

Currensy – Canal Street Confidential
09. "Superstar"

2016

The Game – The Documentary 2 Collector's Edition
01. "Ride Solo" 
02. "Do It to You"

Kent Jones – Tours
05. "Don't Mind"

Fat Joe & Remy Ma 
00. "All the Way Up (Remix)"

Curren$y – Stoned On Ocean EP
01. - 07 "Full Extended Play Mixtape"

2017

Wale - Shine
01. "Thank God" (produced with 808-Ray)

Fat Joe & Remy Ma - Plata O Plomo
02. "Swear To God" (featuring Kent Jones)
03. "Spaghetti" (featuring Kent Jones) (produced with Edsclusive)
04. "All the Way Up (featuring French Montana) (produced with Edsclusive)
07. "Go Crazy" (featuring Sevyn Streeter and BJ the Chicago Kid) (produced with 808-Ray)
10. "Money Showers" (featuring Ty Dolla Sign
12. "Dreamin" (featuring Stephanie Mills)

2018

Royce da 5'9" - Book of Ryan
10. "Boblo Boat" (featuring J. Cole) (produced with 808-Ray)

N.O.R.E. - 5E
02. "Big Chain" (featuring Fabolous)

The Carters - Everything Is Love
01. "Summer" (produced with Beyoncé, JAY-Z and El Michels)
05. "713" (produced with Beyoncé, Jay-Z, 808-Ray and Fred Ball)
08. "Black Effect (produced with Beyoncé and JAY-Z)
10. "Salud!" (produced with Beyoncé, JAY-Z and Beat Butcha)

2019

Ameer Vann - Emmanuel
 01. "Emmanuel" 
 03. "Glock 19" 
 05. "Sunday Night"

Notes

References 

Production discographies
Discographies of American artists
Hip hop discographies